Miller & Yeager was an architectural firm in Terre Haute, Indiana in the United States. It was founded in 1925 by Ewing Miller and Ralph Oscar Yeager, AIA, (b. August 16, 1892). It was one of the predecessor firms of Vonnegut, Wright & Yeager.

Miller & Yeager was located at 402 Opera House Building, Terre Haute, Indiana and was responsible for many landmarks in Terre Haute and Indiana. A number have been listed on the National Register of Historic Places.

In 1946, Ralph O. Yeager was the sole surviving partner of Miller & Yeager and merged the firm with Vonnegut, Bohn & Mueller and Pierre & Wright, both of Indianapolis, Indiana.

Works by Miller & Yeager Architects
Coca-Cola Company Building, Terre Haute, Indiana, built for $200,000.
Terre Haute Post Office and Federal Building, built for $450,000.
Terre Haute City Hall, built for $250,000.
Woodrow Wilson Junior High School (Terre Haute, Indiana) (1927), built for $750,000.
First Church of Christ Scientist (Terre Haute, Indiana), built for $175,000
YMCA Terre Haute, Indiana, built for approximately $275,000
Zorah Shrine (Terre Haute, Indiana), built for $300,000
Union Hospital (Terre Haute, Indiana), built for $375,000
Residence at 19 Jackson Blvd (Terre Haute, Indiana, 1929)

References

Architecture firms based in Indiana
Defunct companies based in Indiana
Design companies established in 1925
Design companies disestablished in 1946
1925 establishments in Indiana
1946 disestablishments in Indiana
Art Deco architects
Beaux Arts architects
Gothic Revival architects